Darius Cătălin Makaria (born 2 February 1993) is a Romanian handballer who plays as a goalkeeper for Cavigal Nice Handball in the France ProLigue.

Achievements
Junior National Championship :
Gold Medalist: 2012
Silver Medalist: 2009, 2011
Liga Națională: 
Gold Medalist: 2016
Bronze Medalist: 2015

References

1993 births
Living people
People from Baia Mare
Romanian male handball players
CS Dinamo București (men's handball) players
Romanian expatriate sportspeople in Spain
Expatriate handball players
Romanian expatriate sportspeople in France